Nationals may refer to:

 People of a given nationality
 A tournament or convention of national scope
 Washington Nationals, a Major League Baseball team based in Washington, DC
 Potomac Nationals, a former minor league baseball team in Woodbridge, VA
 Fredericksburg Nationals, a minor league Low-A baseball team in Fredericksburg, VA
 Syracuse Nationals, a 1946-1963 professional basketball team
 National Party of Australia, a political party
 The Nationals (eSports), an eSports league based in the Philippines
 New Zealand National Party, a political party
 "Nationals" (Glee), an episode of Glee
 The National, an indy band from Ohio

See also
 Nation (disambiguation)
 National (disambiguation)
 Nationality (disambiguation)
 Washington Nationals (disambiguation)
 Young Nationals (disambiguation)